Elephant White is a 2011 American action-thriller film starring Djimon Hounsou and Kevin Bacon. Filming took place in Bangkok, Thailand.

Plot
American assassin Curtie Church (Hounsou) is completing a job in Thailand when 18-year-old child prostitute, Mae, witnesses Church killing a group of her captors, the Chang Cao gang, and afterwards framing the Jong Ang Gang for the murders. 
Church collects his payment for the job from his client, Rajahdon, whose daughter was murdered. 
Church travels to his hideout near a monastery and within sight of Kitty Kat, a Jong Ang Gang club. While Church is eating, Mae arrives. After interrogating her, he ties her up and gags her. 
Church has strange dreams of Mae, then awakes in the monastery. He leaves immediately and kills the snipers watching the club of his weapons dealer, Jimmy (Bacon), taking one of their cellphones.
Church arranges a meeting with Rajahdon, but hides outside until Rajahdon leaves. Church follows him back to a brothel and pays for a room. After entering the room, he asks the girl if Rajahdon is the boss and where he is. He sees Mae riding a white elephant toward him and wakes up at his hideout. He tells Mae his business is finished in Bangkok. Church then wakes up and it is revealed the previous fight sequence was all just a dream.

Boss Katha and Advisor Bhun discuss how to find Church when Rajahdon walks in. It is then revealed that Rajahdon is Katha's son. The planned assassination of Bhun and the gang war was secretly intended by Rajhadoon as a means for him to succeed his father as his father deems him to be unfit to lead the gang and he chooses Bhun as the successor instead. With Bhun out of the way, Rajhadon would kill Church and win himself back into his fathers good graces. Rajahdon says he will take care of Church himself. Church calls Jimmy to tell him he's leaving, but wants Jimmy to take care of Mae. Jimmy tells Rajahdon that Church is leaving, but Rajahdon still wants to kill Church to assure his position as successor to Boss Katha.
Church drives to the gang headquarters and crashes through the wall into the room where Boss Katha and Advisor Bhun are. Church holds Katha hostage while Jimmy and Rajahdon arrive. Church offers to buy all the girls to free them and he begins to tell Katha about the bounty Rajahdon placed on Bhun and whole scheme concocted by Rajadon to succeed as gang leader. Rajahdon tries to shoot him, but Jimmy kills Rajahdon first. The guards then shoot Jimmy but he survived. Disappointed at his son's recklessness, Katha accepts Church's offers to buy the all the girls he has. Church takes a picture of Mae off the wall and Katha says she was the first girl he brought in but she died thirty years ago. Church is confused but soon realizing that he has been talking with Mae's spirit all along who wants him to rescue all the enslaved girls. Jimmy and Church leave with the girls, but Church tells Jimmy he has to go back. Jimmy says he will make sure the girls get help.

Cast

 Djimon Hounsou as Curtis 'Curtie' Church
 Kevin Bacon as Jimmy 'The Brit'
 Jirantanin Pitakporntrakul as Mae
 Weeraprawat Wongpuapan as Boss Katha
 Abhijati "Meuk" Jusakul as Advisor Bhun
 Sahajak Boonthanakit as Rajahdon
 Creighton Mark Johnson as Lead Gunman Bodyguard (uncredited)
 Ron Smoorenburg as Bodyguard (uncredited)
 Desmond O'Neill as Bodyguard (uncredited)

Marketing
At the beginning of the film, in a shot showcasing Bangkok is a billboard advertising The Expendables, which was also made by Nu Image/Millennium Films the previous year.

Home media
The film was released on Blu-ray Disc and DVD on May 17, 2011.

References

External links
 
 
 
 

2011 films
2011 action thriller films
Films shot in Thailand
Films set in Thailand
American action thriller films
Nu Image films
Hollywood Pictures films
Films about drugs
Films about prostitution in Thailand
Films directed by Prachya Pinkaew
Films scored by Robert Folk
2010s American films